Saint Paul Catholic Church is a Catholic parish located in Ellicott City, Maryland. It was founded in 1838 and is part of the Archdiocese of Baltimore.  Babe Ruth married here.

It is a two-story ashlar granite church which faces north.  It is three bays wide and four bays deep.  Its front facade includes two twin Roman arch windows each topped by a rose window, enclosed within a Roman arch lintel with keystone.

History
Saint Paul Catholic Church was constructed on land in Ellicott City acquired from George Ellicott, an early settler of the region. The first pastor of the church was the Rev. Henry Coskery, who prior to the establishment of the parish celebrated Mass at the nearby Castle Angelo. The church was dedicated on December 13, 1838 as the only Catholic parish between Baltimore and Frederick, Maryland. It is now the oldest active Catholic parish between Baltimore and Pittsburgh. Coskery also founded the Christian Brothers' Rock Hill College in 1857.

The Rev. Augustin Verot served as pastor of the church from 1853 to 1858, and was succeeded immediately by the Rev. John Samuel Foley, who served until 1863. Both later became bishops. During the American Civil War, the basement of the church served as a hospital for both Union and Confederate soldiers.

During the pastorate of the Rev. Peter Tarro (1883-1907), several structural improvements were made to the church building. Three marble altars were added to the church, as were new pews, a confessional, Statues and Stations of the Cross, stained-glass windows, a baptistery, and a church spire.

In the early 1900s, many couples who eloped came to St. Paul's to get married. On October 14, 1914, Babe Ruth and his bride Margaret Helen Woodford were married in St. Paul's by the church's pastor, the Rev. Thomas Dolan. He was 19 at the time and she was 17. Ruth, who was known to fabricate certain elements of his personal history, later claimed that he "married [his] first wife in Elkton." However, the marriage certificate lists Ellicott City as the place of his marriage. A copy of the marriage certificate is exhibited by St. Paul's in the church narthex.

The church is included in the local Ellicott City Historic District. In a 1977 draft nomination for the church to be listed on the National Register of Historic Places (which appears never to have been submitted), it was noted that "In addition to its historical merit it is an outstanding example of American eclectic architecture, blending elements of the Gothic and Romanesque in its fenestration and entrances with simple granite architecture so indigenous to Howard County."

St. Paul's Church created a chapel for the students of Rock Hill College in 1859. The side chapel eventually became part of the church proper.

St. Paul's served as a refuge for people during the Ellicott City flood that took place on July 30, 2016. The church's pastor, the Rev. Warren Tanghe, opened one of the church's buildings to people fleeing the floodwaters. Over 50 people stayed in the church. 2 people died in the flood. It hosted flood recovery activity in 2017.

School
What is now Resurrection-St. Paul School was founded as St. Paul Parish School in 1922 at the direction of the St. Paul's pastor, the Rev. Michael Ryan. In its early days it was staffed by the School Sisters of Notre Dame. In 1966, due to the growth of the school population and the lack of space on the St. Paul's property, the location was moved to Paulskirk Drive in Ellicott City, and the school was renamed St. Paul the Apostle School. In 1974, the Church of the Resurrection parish was established on the same property as the school, and it was renamed Resurrection School. In January 1990, the name was changed once more to Resurrection-St. Paul School. It is now fully supported by both parishes, and teaches students from PreK through 8th grade. In 2016, the school's enrollment was 425 students.

Pastors
The following men served as pastor of St. Paul's:
 Rev. Henry B. Coskery (1838-1839)
 Rev. B.S. Piot, SS. (1840-?)
 Rev. B.J. McManus
 Rev. Augustin Verot (1853-1858)
 Rev. John Samuel Foley (1858-1863)
 Rev. T. O'Neill (1864-1870)
 Rev. William E. Starr (1870-1873)
 Rev. John J. Dougherty (1873-1883)
 Rev. Peter Tarro, D.D. (1883-1907)
 Rev. Michael Ryan (1907-1912)
 Rev. D.C. Keenan (1912-1914)
 Rev. Thomas S. Dolan (1914-1920)
 Rev. Michael Ryan (same as above; 1920-1953)
 Rev. Nicholas Dohony (1962-1986)
 Rev. Donald Croghan (1986-1992)
 Rev. Tom Donaghy (1992-2003)
 Rev. Michael Jendrek (2003-2008)
 Rev. Matthew T. Buening (2009-2015)
 Rev. Samuel Young (2015)
 Rev. Warren V. Tanghe (2016–2019)
 Msgr. John Dietzenbach (2020–present)

References

Roman Catholic churches in Maryland